Heathrow Terminal 4 is a railway station at Terminal 4 of London Heathrow Airport served by the Elizabeth line.

The separate Heathrow Terminal 4 Underground station on the  Piccadilly line is adjacent to this station. Journeys to and from Heathrow Terminals 2 & 3 railway station are free of charge and can be used by passengers changing terminals at Heathrow.

History
The station opened on 23 June 1998, together with the Heathrow Express. From 1998 to 2008, the station was the terminus of the Heathrow Express service from London Paddington. All services terminated here after calling at Heathrow Central. In 2005, the Heathrow Connect service was introduced, which provided a slower service to Paddington but calling at local stations along the way, as well as offering cheaper fares. This service also terminated at Terminal 4, together with the Heathrow Express. Upon the opening of the new Heathrow Terminal 5 station in 2008, all Heathrow Express services were re-routed to terminate there, and services to Terminal 4 were replaced with an every 15minute shuttle service, which ran between Heathrow Central and Terminal 4. Most Heathrow Connect services then terminated at Heathrow Central, although on Sundays, they continued to Terminal 4.

On 20 May 2018, TfL Rail took over the Heathrow Connect service in readiness for becoming part of the Elizabeth line, which at the time was expected to open in December 2018. From May 2018 until 5 November 2022, trains ran half hourly between London Paddington and Heathrow Terminal 4; an additional shuttle runs between Terminal 4 and Heathrow Terminals 2 & 3 railway station to maintain a train service of every 15minutes between the two stations. On 9 May 2020, Heathrow Terminal 4 station closed temporarily until further notice, due to the closure of the airport's Terminal 4 during the COVID-19 pandemic in London. The station was reopened on 14 June 2022. On 24 May 2022, the Elizabeth line took over operations of services at the station, with through services to Abbey Wood via central London commencing on 6 November 2022.

Services

Frequency
All services from Heathrow Terminal 4 are operated by Elizabeth line.

 2 trains per hour to Abbey Wood
 2 trains per hour additional shuttle to Heathrow Terminals 2 & 3

From May 2023 trains will travel to Shenfield on the Great Eastern Main Line.

Service table

Connections

London Buses routes 482 and 490 serve the station.

References

External links

1998 establishments in England
4 station
Railway stations in the London Borough of Hillingdon
Railway stations opened by Railtrack
Railway stations in Great Britain opened in 1998
Railway stations in Great Britain not served by their managing company
Railway stations served by the Elizabeth line
Airport railway stations in the United Kingdom